Seaboard is a synonym for coastline. It can also refer to:

 Seaboard, North Carolina, a small town in the United States
 Seaboard, Virginia, an unincorporated community and coal town in the United States
 Seaboard Corporation, an international agribusiness company
 Seaboard International, an international oilfield equipment engineering and manufacturing company, or its subsidiary Seaboard Wireline
 Seaboard Air Line Railroad in the United States or its successors:
 Seaboard Coast Line Railroad
 Seaboard System Railroad
 Seaboard World Airlines (1960 to 1980), an international cargo airline that also served as a U.S. military carrier 
 Seaboard World Airlines Flight 253A, a Soviet-American airspace incident in 1968
 ROLI Seaboard - musical instrument designed and made by ROLI

See also
Seeboard, a former British electricity company
Eastern seaboard (disambiguation)

 East Coast (disambiguation)
 West Coast (disambiguation)